Kyle Davis (born July 9, 1978) is an American actor. He is known for his roles in the comedy drama Men of a Certain Age and American Horror Story.

Early life
Davis was born in Downey, California. When he was 14, he and his parents moved to Arizona. He attended Sedona Red Rock High School and then studied photography at Yavapi Community College. After that, he wanted to enlist in the military, but he was involved in a fight that left him blind in his left eye, preventing him from being deployed.

In 1998, Davis moved to Southern California to become a professional skateboarder. However, shortly after arriving, he tore his ACL. After some time, his cousin convinced him to consider acting instead.

Career
At the age of 20, Davis began his career appearing on The Dating Game and working as an extra on shows and commercials.

Davis' first official TV role came in 2001, on an episode of Angel. After that, he has appeared in shows like Felicity, Monk, The Shield, ER, and CSI: Crime Scene Investigation. He also appeared on films like Catch Me If You Can, Elizabethtown, and the Friday the 13th remake.

From 2007 to 2011, he has had recurring roles on the comedy It's Always Sunny in Philadelphia and Men of a Certain Age. In 2011, he had recurring roles on Dexter and American Horror Story.

Personal life
Davis lives in North Hollywood with his wife, April Chappell.

Filmography

Film

Television

References

External links

1978 births
Living people
American male film actors
People from Downey, California
People from Uvalde, Texas